Saleh Fayez Al-Jawhari (born 5 March 1980) is a Jordanian professional footballer who plays as a forward for Jordanian club Al-Jazeera and the Jordan national team.

International career
Al-Jawhari played his first international match against Bahrain in the semifinals of the 2014 WAFF Championship in Doha, on 4 January 2014, which ended in a 1–0 victory for Jordan.

Career statistics

International

Honors

International
Jordan
 WAFF Championship runner-up: 2014

References
 Saleh Al-Jawhari Officially Transfers to Al-Wehdat
 Saleh Al-Jawhari: "In Over a Night, I Found Myself Outside of the National Team...And Al-Jazeera (Amman) are on the Move and I Will Beware of it"
 Saleh Al-Jawhari: "My Award for Best Player in the League May Put Into a New Stage to Lead the National Team"

External links 
 
 
 

1989 births
Living people
Jordanian footballers
Jordan international footballers
Jordan youth international footballers
Association football midfielders
Footballers at the 2010 Asian Games
Sportspeople from Amman
Al-Wehdat SC players
Al-Jazeera (Jordan) players
Asian Games competitors for Jordan
Al-Salt SC players
Hilal Al-Quds Club players
Shabab Al-Ordon Club players
West Bank Premier League players
Jordanian expatriate sportspeople in the State of Palestine
Expatriate footballers in the State of Palestine
Jordanian expatriate footballers
Jordanian Pro League players